Andrew McGuigan (24 February 1878 – 1948) was a Scottish professional footballer, described as "speedy and tricky".

He began his career with Hibernian, before signing with Liverpool in 1900. With Liverpool he won a First Division champions medal in 1900–01. He was sold on to Middlesbrough in December 1902, but then struggled with injury and wound down his career in brief spells at Southport Central, Accrington Stanley, Burslem Port Vale, Bristol City, Barrow, and Exeter City. He was later on the board of directors at Liverpool.

Career

Hibernian
McGuigan started his professional career in 1898 with Hibernian in Division One of the Scottish Football League, following move from local side Newton Stewart (where he was playing when selected for an international trial match in 1897). He made his Hibs debut against Partick Thistle on 3 September, and scored in the 4–1 win. He went on to score seven goals in 19 games in the 1898–99 season. He was the club's top scorer in the 1899–1900 campaign, hitting 12 goals in 19 games. During his time at Easter Road the club managed two top four finishes within a few points of second place, but some distance from the dominant Rangers.

Liverpool
He signed with Liverpool for the 1900–01 season and made his debut against Derby County on 6 October. He scored five goals in 14 First Division games, as the "Reds" were crowned champions of English football for the first time. He then scored nine goals in eighteen league games in 1901–02; five of his goals came in one game at Anfield, in a 7–0 win over Stoke on 4 January 1902, the first time a Liverpool player accomplished such a feat in a competitive match. He scored 14 goals in 37 games in all competitions for Liverpool.

Later career
He was signed by Middlesbrough for a £300 fee in December 1902, but injury problems limited to just a single league appearance. He then spent a season with Brynn Central, scoring nearly 30 goals as the pivot of the club's forward line. He moved on to Southport Central, Accrington Stanley, Burslem Port Vale (without playing a game), Bristol City and Barrow. He joined Exeter City in the summer of 1908 as the club turned professional. He finished as the club's top-scorer with 16 Southern League goals. He retired the following season and spent time coaching in Bilbao, Spain. He returned to Liverpool as a scout.

Style of play
McGuigan was a "speedy and tricky" forward that was described by the Lancashire Evening Post as having "capital control of the ball, and accurate feeding... his methods are characterised by sound judgment and artistic execution".

Later life
He later became a club director at Liverpool, serving on the club's board when Liverpool won the championship two years in a row in 1921–22 and 1922–23.

Career statistics

Honours
Liverpool
Football League First Division: 1900–01

References

1878 births
People from Newton Stewart
Footballers from Dumfries and Galloway
1948 deaths
Scottish footballers
Association football forwards
Newton Stewart F.C. players
Hibernian F.C. players
Liverpool F.C. players
Middlesbrough F.C. players
Brynn Central F.C. players
Southport F.C. players
Accrington Stanley F.C. (1891) players
Port Vale F.C. players
Bristol City F.C. players
Barrow A.F.C. players
Exeter City F.C. players
Association football scouts
Liverpool F.C. non-playing staff
Scottish Football League players
English Football League players
Southern Football League players
English expatriate football managers
Expatriate football managers in Spain